Jean-Claude Van Damme (born 1960) is a Belgian martial artist and actor.

Van Damme may also refer to:

People
Art Van Damme (1920–2010), American jazz accordionist
Eric van Damme, (born 1956), Dutch economist
Frans Van Damme (1858–1925), Belgian painter
Ivo Van Damme (1954–1976), Belgian athlete
Jelle Van Damme (born 1983), Belgian footballer
Joachim Van Damme (born 1991), Belgian footballer
Johannes van Damme (1935–1994), Dutch engineer executed in Singapore for drug smuggling
Stéphane Van Damme (born 1969), French historian

Entertainment
Jean-Claude Van Damme: Behind Closed Doors, a British television reality show around the eponymous person
 Capheus "Van Damme" Onyango, a character in the television series Sense8

Other uses
Memorial Van Damme, an annual athletics event in Brussels, Belgium
Van Damme State Park, Mendocino County, California

See also
Van Dam, a surname
Van Damm, a surname
Vandamme, a surname

Surnames of Dutch origin
Surnames of Belgian origin
Dutch-language surnames